Dataran Bandaraya Johor Bahru or (Johor Bahru City Square) is the main square in Johor Bahru, Johor, Malaysia.

History
It was built on 1 January 1994 following the declaration of Johor Bahru as a city.

Architecture
The city square features a clock tower which was constructed not long after the opening of the square.

Activities
The square is often used for official events, as well as sport competitions. At night, the area turns into an eatery area.

See also
 List of tourist attractions in Johor

References

1994 establishments in Malaysia
Buildings and structures in Johor Bahru
Squares in Malaysia
Tourist attractions in Johor
20th-century architecture in Malaysia